Sotto means below, under in Italian. It is also a Filipino surname that may refer to:
 Sotto family, a political family in the Philippines with additional influence in the entertainment industry
 Ciara Sotto (born 1980), Filipino actress, singer, and daughter of Tito Sotto and Helen Gamboa
 Filemon Sotto (1872–1966), Filipino politician
 Gian Sotto (born 1978), Filipino politician and son of Tito Sotto and Helen Gamboa
 Miko Sotto (1982–2003), Filipino matinee idol and actor
 Oyo Boy Sotto (born 1984), Filipino actor and son of Vic Sotto
 Pauleen Luna Sotto (born 1988), Filipina television personality and wife of Vic Sotto
 Val Sotto (born 1945), Filipino singer, composer, comedian, and brother of Tito Sotto and Vic Sotto
 Vicente Sotto (1877–1950), Filipino politician
 Vicente "Tito" Sotto III (born 1948), Filipino actor, comedian, politician, and singer-songwriter
 Vic Sotto (born 1954), Filipino actor and television presenter
 Vico Sotto (born 1989), Filipino politician, son of Vic Sotto, and current mayor of Pasig
 Benjamin Sotto (born 1980), French heavy metal vocalist
 Eddie Sotto (born 1958), American designer, mixed-media producer and conceptualist
 Ervin Sotto (born 1981), Filipino basketball player
 Kai Sotto (born 2002), Filipino professional basketball player
 Remberto G. Sotto (born 1949), Filipino politician